Adult Contemporary is a chart published by Billboard ranking the top-performing songs in the United States in the adult contemporary music (AC) market, based on weekly airplay data from radio stations compiled by Nielsen Broadcast Data Systems.

In the first issue of the new year Billboard dated January 5, "Girls Like You" by Maroon 5 featuring Cardi B moved into the top spot, displacing the last chart-topper of 2018, "Cozy Little Christmas" by Katy Perry. "Girls Like You" topped the chart for a total of 34 non-consecutive weeks, with 31 being consecutive. The song spent two additional weeks atop the chart in November 2018, giving it a total of 36 weeks in the top spot and breaking the previous record for the most weeks spent atop the AC chart set by Uncle Kracker's 2003 version of "Drift Away". It was displaced in the issue of Billboard dated August 10 by Lauren Daigle's "You Say", which became the first song to top both the Christian Airplay chart and the AC listing. "Girls Like You" regained the top spot for an additional three weeks beginning in the issue dated August 17.

In the fall, pop-rock band Jonas Brothers gained their first AC number one with "Sucker", which spent eleven consecutive weeks atop the chart before being displaced by "Someone You Loved" by Scottish singer Lewis Capaldi in the issue dated December 7.  One week later the Jonas Brothers achieved their second number-one hit of 2019 when "Like It's Christmas" ascended to number one.  The song was the year's final chart-topper.

Chart history

See also
2019 in American music

References

2019
Number-one adult contemporary singles
United States Adult Contemporary